Itaobim is a municipality in the northeast of the Brazilian state of Minas Gerais.  Its population in 2020 was 21,029 inhabitants in a total area of 680 km².

It belongs to the Pedra Azul statistical microregion. The elevation of the municipal seat is 180 meters. It became a municipality in 1962. This municipality is located on the important BR-116 highway, 43 km. south of Medina. It is on the left bank of the Jequitinhonha River.  The climate is hot and humid with an annual average temperature of 24.4°C.

Neighboring municipalities are: Medina, Jequitinhonha, Ponto dos Volantes and Itinga.  The distance to the state capital, Belo Horizonte is 604 kilometers.

The main economic activities are cattle raising and subsistence farming. The GDP was R$93,447,000 (2005). There were 1 banking agency in 2006. In the rural area there were 948 farms with around 2,500 people involved in the agricultural sector. There was a planted area of around 3,000 hectares. The main cash crop was mangoes with 200 hectares planted. There were 13 tractors, a ratio of one tractor for every 73 farms. In the health sector there were 14 health clinics and 1 hospital with 61 beds. The score on the Municipal Human Development Index was 0.689. This ranked the city 592 out of 853 municipalities in the state, with Poços de Caldas in first place with 0.841 and Setubinha in last place with 0.568. See Frigoletto for the complete list. 
Degree of urbanization: 75.58
Illiteracy rate: 26.73
Infant mortality rate: 25.46
Percentage of urban houses connected to the sewage system: 2.70

See also
List of municipalities in Minas Gerais

References

Statistics from IBGE
Social indicators

Municipalities in Minas Gerais